Bryan Art (formerly Brah Yhan or Brahyhan Art), born Bryan Joseph Grant in Murray Mount, Saint Ann Parish is a Jamaican reggae singer, songwriter, musician, producer, and guitarist. He is a former touring member of the Legendary Fire House Crew and band leader/guitarist of the Grass Roots Band. He was named Best New Artist in the year 2002 by Television Jamaica's ER (Entertainment Report).

Biography

Background
Bryan Art was born in Murray Mount, a rural community in the Parish of Saint Ann, Jamaica, a few miles away from Nine Mile, where Reggae legend Bob Marley was born. Bryan, the youngest of 12 children, was raised in a home where most of his family members were musically inclined. As a young boy, Bryan emulated his eldest brother Ray, a musician and singer who had several recordings. However, it was his mother who first taught him how to play the guitar. Grant left Murray Mount in the late 1980s and moved to Kingston, Jamaica, where he currently resides. In the mid 1990s, Bryan attended The Edna Manley College of Visual and Performing Arts.

While attending the College, Grant was discovered and recruited by band leader George Miller (Fyah George) of the Firehouse Crew. He was asked to join the band as lead guitarist, providing musical support for Philip "Fatis" Burrell's Xterminator Production artists Luciano, Mikey General and Sizzla. A few years later, Grant became co-founder and band leader of Grass Roots Band, which supported and toured with Reggae artist Bushman. He also filled in occasionally as a guitarist on tours with Black Uhuru.

Brah Yhan to Bryan Art transition

In 2001, Grant released his first single as a solo artist using the stage name "Brah Yhan", which is a moniker and customized spelling/pronunciation in Jamaican Patois of the name Bryan. The track was titled Soon Come Back. This song was produced by Grant with Courtney Morrison for FiWi Music Label, who had signed him previously. In 2002, Brah Yhan was awarded the Best New Artiste of the year by Television Jamaica's ER. Over a 3-year period, Brah Yhan recorded and released several other songs, the majority under the FiWi Music Label, including "When Your Eyes Speak," "Stain," "Hug Me Baby", and "Wrong Time". However, Grant's most notable releases are "Rock And Come In" in 2004 and "Get It" in 2005. In the same year, Bryan cut ties with FiWi Music and changed his stage name to Brahyhan Art. In 2009, after his hit song "Murder Dem A Play" was released he changed his name for a second time to Bryan Art.

In 2010, Art released his debut album titled Bryan Art 20Ten on the Junction File/Jah Chin Label. In 2012, he registered his record label, Junction Files. In 2013, Bryan Art repackaged Bryan Art 20Ten and re-titled it Bryan Art with some changes to the track line up. He entered into a distribution agreement with AL.TA.FA.AN/VPAL Music Label. The following year (2014), he formed The File 13 Band which consisted of a few talented young musicians he recruited from his alma mater. Later that year, he released Fresh Start EP on his own Junction Files Label.

Career

Art has performed at several local and international shows including the Jamaica Jazz and Blues Festival, Rebel Salute, ATI, Fully Loaded, St. Mary Mi Come From, Unity Splash, and Reggae Month event. He was appointed Reggae Month Ambassador for 2014. Art has appeared on national television shows including TVJ's Smile Jamaica, Entertainment Prime, CVM TV's On Stage and CVM at Sunrise, among others.

His international appearances included tours of the Caribbean, United States, Europe and Canada. In Europe, he performed at Reggae Jam 2011. In Canada, he performed at Calgary International Reggae Festival in 2012. As a songwriter, he has penned songs for artists such as Etana, George Nooks, Singing Melody, Bushman, and Luciano. As a musician, he has recorded scores of Guitar tracks on many local and international projects including The Sunshine Riddim on Nelly Furtado's "Turn Off The Light" (Reggae Mix), The Natty Bay Riddim on her song "... On the Radio (Remember the Days)." He appears on Queen Ifrica's hit song "Far Away" Acoustic remix.

He has been featured in Reggae magazines and websites such as United Reggae, Reggaeville, Reggae France and Irie Mag. He has also been featured on several international blogs including Jamendo in 2014. Today, Bryan Art has appeared on several Reggae/Dancehall Riddim compilation albums along with some of the leading Reggae recording artists.

Discography

Albums

EPs

Singles

Bibliography 
 A Fresh Start For Bryan Art, www.reggaeearthunited.com 
 Bryan Art on www.reggaeville.com 
 Bryan Art on www.mtv.com 
 Bryan Art Knowledge Is The Power music video, www.topshelfreggae.com 
 Bryan Art on www.onlylyrics.com

References

External links
 Get it by Bryan Art
 Soon Come Back by Bryan Art
 Rock & Come In by Bryan Art
 Fresh Start E.P by Bryan Art
 Bryan Art epk/bio

1977 births
Living people
Jamaican reggae singers
Jamaican guitarists
Male guitarists
Jamaican male songwriters
21st-century guitarists
21st-century Jamaican male singers